The Avante 2000 is a corvette design by the Navantia shipyard of Spain. Navantia has developed a Avante family of ships with different sizes but adapted to different missions and sharing the same design standard.

Navantia integrated multiple systems, including its Catiz combat management system, Hermesys integrated communications system, Dorna fire-control system and Minerva integrated bridge system.

Variants

Guaiquerí-class patrol boat

Four Avante 2000 corvettes were built by Navantia to the Guaiquerí-class design for the Venezuelan Navy with the first ship commissioned in April 2011 and the last in January 2012.

Al Jubail-class corvette 
In July 2018, it was announced that Navantia had signed an agreement with the Royal Saudi Navy for the production of five Avante 2000 corvettes with the last to be delivered by 2022 at a cost of approximately 2 billion Euros.

Navantia signed a joint-venture agreement with state-owned Saudia Arabian Military Industries (SAMI) to build five corvettes based on Avante 2000 for Royal Saudi Naval Forces (RSNF). Under the agreement, the last vessel must be delivered in 2024, including construction, life cycle support for five years, with an option for another five years. The RSNF variant is called Avante 2200.

The Saudi Arabian variant is a 2,000-ton class vessel capable of performing anti-submarine warfare (ASW), anti-surface warfare (ASuW) and anti-air warfare (AAW). The Al Jubail-class corvette has a maximum range of 4,500 nautical miles, achieving 25 knots powered by four diesel engines in CODAD arrangement.

The Al Jubail class is fitted with Leonardo SUPER RAPID 76 mm main gun, Rheinmetall Air Defence MILLENNIUM 35mm close-in weapon system, four 12.7 mm machine guns, two triple torpedo tubes, two by quad anti-ship missiles and 64 ESSM surface-to-air missiles (16-cell Mk 41).

References

External links
 POVZEE Offshore Patrol Vessel
 Navantia Launches and Commissions Two OPVs to Venezuelan Navy

Corvette classes